The eared nightjars are a small group of nocturnal birds in the nightjar family, although the taxonomy is uncertain. There are seven species, mainly found in forest and scrub from China to Australia. 5 species are placed in the genus, Eurostopodus, the other two species in Lyncornis. They are long winged birds with plumage patterned with grey and brown to camouflage them when resting on the ground. They feed on insects caught in flight. A single white egg is laid directly on the ground and incubated by both adults. The chicks can walk soon after hatching.

Taxonomy
The order Caprimulgiformes contains several families of nocturnal insectivores, these are the frogmouths, the potoos, the oilbird and the nightjars. The latter family is normally split into two subfamilies, the American nighthawks, Chordelinae, and the typical nightjars Caprimulginae. The eared nightjars are sometimes considered a subfamily Eurostopodinae of the Caprimulgidae but some studies have them as a sister group, while others treat them as a clade within the caprimulgids; others consider that the genus Eurostopodus may not be monophyletic.

The eared nightjars consist of seven extant species in two genera, Eurostopodus and Lyncornis:

Description
The eared nightjars are large compared to many nightjars, but otherwise are similar in structure. They are long-winged and long-tailed, and are light for the wing area, making them powerful and agile in flight. An important difference from typical nightjars is the lack of bristles around the beak. They are nocturnal and have a reflective tapetum lucidum at the back of the eye. The beaks are small, but these birds have a very large gape for catching insects in flight. The feet and legs are small and weak, and the toes are partly webbed. The middle toe's claw has a comb-like pecten on its inner edge, which may be used for plumage care.

The plumage is cryptically patterned with browns and greys, to make these ground-nesting birds difficult to see when resting during the day. Some species have white patches in the wings, and the two in the genus Lyncornis (Great and Malaysian) have "ear tufts" at the rear of the crown. The songs of these birds are three or more repeated notes, sometimes with whistles or bubbling sounds, and are typically given at dawn or dusk.

Distribution and habitat
The eared nightjars are found from China through Southeast Asia to Australia. Tropical populations are mostly sedentary, but the two Australian species (spotted and white-throated nightjars) are partial migrants. These are birds of open woodland or forest clearings and edges.

Behaviour

Breeding
No nest is built, the single white egg is laid directly on to the ground or leaf litter. The female incubates the egg during the day, relying mainly on the excellent camouflage of the plumage to avoid predators. The male takes over incubation during the night, but roosts some distance away when the female is brooding. If necessary, the female will attempt to distract the intruder away from the eggs, or perform a defence display with spread wings, puffed throat and hissing sounds. The eggs hatch in three to four weeks, and the young can walk soon after hatching. The chicks are fed by both parents.

Feeding
All eared nightjars feed almost entirely on insects caught in flight, typically moths and beetles. They hunt at twilight and in the night, and eat their prey on the wing. The flight is buoyant and twisting, and may be interspersed with periods of resting on the ground, a road, or in a tree. These birds drink in flight, gliding low over the water and dipping the beak.

Citations

General and cited sources 
 

Caprimulgiformes